Andrej Šporn (born 1 December 1981 in Kranjska Gora) is a former Slovenian alpine skier.

Šporn began his career as a competitor in slalom, though he had always shown great talent in both fast disciplines – the downhill and Super-G – and is also good in giant slalom. He was a successful competitor from an early age, having won competitions in his native Slovenia in the junior category. He did very well at the Junior World Ski Championship and finished in the top ten in slalom as well as downhill. In the 2003/04 season, he shined in the European Cup in which he won finished 4th in the slalom standings. One of his early successes at that level was the slalom win at the Universiade in Zakopane, Poland, in February 2001.

After having had mainly focused on slalom, after the super combination had been introduced as a new discipline, he started to compete in downhill, too. Good results convinced him to start training fast disciplines as main ones and he had help of top trainers with that.

His debut in the Ski World Cup was in a slalom race at Beaver Creek in 2004 in which was he finished 8th. place. In 2006, his best results were 6th place in the classic alpine combination in Kitzbuhel and also 6th place in the super alpine combination in Chamonix. He also had a good season in downhill, finishing 2nd in Kitzbuhel, 5th in Kvitfjell and 6th in Bormio.

Šporn participated at two Winter Olympics, in Torino in 2006 and in Vancouver in 2010, but did not achieve any remarkable results.

In 2011, at the Ski World Championship in Garmisch-Partenkirchen, he achieved great success by finishing 6th in the downhill race.

Following an injury in 2017, Šporn announced his retirement from competitive sport.

World Cup results

Season standings

Race podiums

See also 

 Races of Andrej Sporn in Alpine world cup skiing
 Races of Andrej Sporn on Youtube

References 

1981 births
Living people
Slovenian male alpine skiers
Alpine skiers at the 2006 Winter Olympics
Alpine skiers at the 2010 Winter Olympics
Olympic alpine skiers of Slovenia
Universiade medalists in alpine skiing
People from Kranjska Gora
Universiade silver medalists for Slovenia
Competitors at the 2001 Winter Universiade
Competitors at the 2003 Winter Universiade
Competitors at the 2005 Winter Universiade